Goldie Boutilier (born Kristin Kathleen Boutilier, July 31, 1985), known previously by her stage names My Name Is Kay, Kay, and Goldilox, is a Canadian singer, songwriter, model and DJ.

Born and raised in Reserve Mines, Nova Scotia, Boutilier moved to Los Angeles at the age of 20 to pursue a music career. After being discovered by OneRepublic member Ryan Tedder, Boutilier signed a recording contract with Interscope Records under the alias My Name Is Kay (later shortened to just Kay), and released her self-titled debut EP, My Name Is Kay, in 2011. Following a string of successful features with Tiësto and Steve Aoki, Boutilier released her debut album, My Name Is Kay in 2013.

After dealing with tensions with her label, Boutilier split with Universal sometime in 2015. Boutilier then moved to Paris, France and began DJing under the name Goldilox. She released second album, Very Best, in 2018 independently under the name Goldilox. In 2020, she changed her stage name to Goldie Boutilier.

Boutilier is a successful model, appearing in campaigns for Diesel Black Gold, H&M, John Galliano, Casablanca and Luisaviaroma. She is currently represented by VIVA Model Management in Europe.

Career

2011–2015: Career beginnings and My Name is Kay
In 2011 Boutilier was signed to Interscope Records under the moniker My Name Is Kay. She released her debut single "My Name Is Kay" on April 2, 2011. The song was moderately successful, charting on the Canadian Hot 100, debuting at No. 80, and peaking at No. 63. An EP of the same name was released on December 20, 2011, but was soon pulled from iTunes after Interscope shortened Boutilier's moniker to Kay. It was rereleased on February 28, 2012. The EP featured appearances from Pusha T and Kurtis Blow on the songs "Strangers" and "Going Diamond" respectively, as well as song writing credits from the likes of Ryan Tedder (of OneRepublic), Grammy award-winning songwriter Evan Bogart, Cherry Cherry Boom Boom, and producer Doctor Rosen Rosen. The EP received mixed reviews, comparing Boutilier to the likes of Katy Perry, Nicki Minaj, and Gwen Stefani.

On November 13, 2012 Boutilier released her second EP, Say What You Want. The EP featured the single "Rewind The Track" which was released a week prior. In a November 2012 interview with Idolator, Boutilier described the song with, "It reflects a time and place in my life that I both cherish and feel emotional towards. It’s a special song for me”.

Boutilier released her debut album, My Name Is Kay, on October 22, 2013. It was preceded by the singles "Whatever", "Next To You", and "Alive". The album received mixed reviews, being called "forgettable."

For the next two years Boutilier fought to be let out of her contracts with Interscope and Universal. Due to her legal fees, she began working at a restaurant to support herself. Boutilier ended up being able to get out of her contract, but was barred from using the name Kay. In an interview with Venice Magazine Boutilier stated: “I couldn’t use that name anymore. So I said, ‘Fine, keep it. I don’t know what you’re going do with it,’”.

2016–2018: Skin and Very Best 
Boutilier re-emerged under the moniker Goldilox in 2015, where she began DJing and modeling in Paris, France. She soon signed a recording contract with Sony Music imprint, Insanity Records. She released her EP Skin on September 16, 2016. The EP was produced by Guillaume Doubet and Dan Farber, the former becoming a longstanding collaborator for Boutilier.

On February 20, 2018, Boutilier released "Michael's Song" under Room 108 Productions. It marked her first release as an independent artist. Singles "Ketamine", "Decision", and "Touch You Where It Hurts" followed soon after in the next couples months, all produced by Guillaume Doubet.

Her second album, Very Best, was released July 31, 2018. It followed the single "I Love You", which was released on June 29, 2018. The album is inspired by Boutilier's love for disco music. In an interview with Ladygunn Magazine, Boutilier stated: “I remember seeing this book about Studio 54. When I opened the book, I saw all these pictures of people having fun, dancing, laughing, drinking with champagne, hanging with people I wish I could have met. Bianca Jagger riding into the club on a white horse…I wanted to capture that energy.”

2019–present: New music 
Originally titled Goldcity, work on Boutilier's third album began in 2019. In an interview with Schön! Magazine, Boutilier talked about the new album with: "It was my intention to do more of a timeless album. I did a lot of digging through my parents’ records. This is the first time I’ve worked with a producer that plays real instruments. I highly recommend doing this if you can’t find “your sound”." In the same interview she revealed her legal name was changed to Goldie Boutilier, and that she also decided to change her stage name to her real name, describing that the 'lox' in Goldilox "felt juvenile".

On August 25, 2022, Boutilier released "He Thinks That I'm an Angel", her first single in over four years, and her first official release under the name Goldie Boutilier.

Discography

LP

EPs

Singles

Promotional singles

As featured artist

Guest appearances

Music videos

Tours

Opening act
 Sorry For Party Rocking Tour (2012)

Special guest
 The Cherrytree Pop Alternative Tour (2011)
 Shipwrecked Tour (2011–12)

References

External links
 

1985 births
Interscope Records artists
Living people
Musicians from Nova Scotia
People from Sydney, Nova Scotia
Kay
21st-century Canadian women singers